Find Your Wings, the second album by American singer-songwriter Anna Danes, is a collection of jazz standards and original songs. It was released in the US by DLG Recordings in 2016. The album peaked at No. 22 on the jazz chart at Billboard magazine.

Danes delivered a Tedx event talk, titled, Find Your Wings, in Solana Beach, California on August 25, 2018. She spoke about surviving breast cancer and escaping communist Poland when she was ten years old. She sang the title track from her album a cappella after her talk.

Track listing

Personnel
 Anna Danes – vocals
 Rich Ruttenberg - music arranger, piano
 Trey Henry – bass
 John Ferraro – drums

Release history

References

2016 albums
Albums produced by Dave Darling

Albums recorded at Capitol Studios